"In-tango" is a song by Italian dancer and singer-songwriter In-Grid, released in 2003. The English version of this song, entitled "We Tango Alone", was included as a B-side track in Italy and issued as its own single in Australia. "In-tango" reached the top 10 in Denmark and entered the top 40 in Germany, Greece, Hungary, and Spain.

Song information 
The story is about In-Grid who watches a movie called In-Tango. She is the star of that movie. In the movie she is late for the Prom. She approaches a handsome gentleman and they dance. The girl that was dancing with that man leaves jealously. The movie ends with all the audience leaving because of the lyrics of the song that are quite disturbing. When In-Grid watches the movie she wears the same clothes as when she acted and sang the same song that she sang in the movie.

Lyrics 
The lyrics were written by In-Grid and Marco Soncini, who co-produced the song with Alfredo Larry Pignagnoli. The English version was also co-written by Daniela Galli (also known as Dhany) and Paul Sears.

Track listings 

Italian maxi-CD single
 "In-tango" (In-String edit) – 3:25
 "In-tango" (In-String extended) – 4:22
 "In-tango" (Gambafreaks remix) – 5:07
 "In-tango" (Sfaction mix full extended) – 5:05
 "We Tango Alone" (edit) – 3:26

Italian 12-inch single
A1. "In-tango" (In-String extended) – 4:22
A2. "In-tango" (In-String edit) – 3:25
B1. "In-tango" (Gambafreaks remix) – 5:07
B2. "In-tango" (Sfaction mix full extended) – 5:05

European CD single
 "In-tango" (In-String edit) – 3:25
 "In-tango" (In-String extended) – 4:22

German maxi-CD single
 "In-tango" (In-String edit) – 3:25
 "In-tango" (Pocho edit) – 3:47
 "In-tango" (In-String extended) – 4:22
 "In-tango" (video)

Australian CD single
 "In-tango (We Tango Alone)" (radio edit) – 3:26
 "In-tango (We Tango Alone)" (extended) – 4:26
 "In-tango" (radio edit) – 3:26
 "In-tango" (Gambafreaks remix) – 5:00
 "In-tango" (S-Faction mix Benny Benassi remix) – 5:05
 "In-tango" (In-Piano extended mix) – 4:19
 "You Promised Me (Tu es foutu)" (radio edit) – 3:40
 "Tu es foutu" (Harlem Hustlers club mix) – 7:34

Charts

References

External links 
 Watch In-tango
 Benny benassi remix

2003 singles
English-language Italian songs
In-Grid songs
Italian-language songs
Songs written by Dhany